Aljoša Čampara (born 20 January 1975) is a Bosnian politician serving as the Federal Minister of Interior since 2015. He was also a member of the Federal House of Peoples and was the Deputy mayor of Sarajevo as well.

Čampara was a member of the Party of Democratic Action, until he left it in 2020 to join the People and Justice party a year later.

Early life and education
Čampara was born in Dubrovnik to a very influential family, but has nearly all his life lived in Sarajevo. His father was Avdo Čampara, a prominent Bosniak politician and a close associate of Alija Izetbegović, a Bosniak leader during the Bosnian War. After finishing elementary school and high school, Čampara attended the Sarajevo Faculty of Law.

Political career
Soon after graduating, Čampara was employed as an associate in the Department for Personnel Issues and the Department for Protocols of the Parliamentary Assembly of Bosnia and Herzegovina. After that, he held a various administrative duties, he was a secretary of the Constitutional-Legal Commission of the national House of Peoples, and later a secretary of the House of Peoples, than a secretary of the Joint Service of the Parliamentary Assembly of Bosnia and Herzegovina, after which he was named an advisor of the Chairman of the House of Peoples, later becoming a member of the Legislative-Legal Commission of the House of Peoples, where he served as an external expert. Čampara was also a member of the Steering Committee of the Faculty of Political Science in Sarajevo. He is currently a member of the Assembly of the Islamic Community of Bosnia and Herzegovina.

Ivo Komšić was elected Mayor of Sarajevo on 27 March 2013, while Čampara was elected Deputy Mayor as a Bosniak representative, along with Rako Čović, who was elected as the Serb representative.

Since 31 March 2015, Čampara has been serving as the Federal Minister of Interior in the government of Fadil Novalić.

References

External links
Aljoša Čampara at javnarasprava.ba

1975 births
Living people
People from Dubrovnik
University of Sarajevo alumni
Politicians of the Federation of Bosnia and Herzegovina
Party of Democratic Action politicians
People and Justice politicians